San Francisco Jaltepetongo  is a town and municipality in Oaxaca in south-western Mexico. It is part of the Nochixtlán District in the southeast of the Mixteca Region. 

As of 2005, the municipality had a total population of 881.

References

Municipalities of Oaxaca